Gladijatori u BG Areni (trans. Gladiators in Belgrade Arena) is a double and the fifth live album by Serbian and former Yugoslav rock band Riblja Čorba. The album was recorded on Riblja Čorba concert held in Belgrade Arena, on March 10, 2007.

The opening track "Ostaću slobodan" features the sound of motorcycles that started the concert driving onto the stage. The track "Nojeva barka" features the band's leader Bora Đorđević reading his poem with pornographic lyrics "Zašto sve što je lepo ima kraj". The track "Vetar duva, duva, duva" features Đorđević introducing band members as convicts and fugitives indicted for war crimes: Nikola Zorić as Veselin Šljivančanin, Miša Aleksić as Biljana Plavšić, Vicko Milatović as Milorad Ulemek Legija (an infamous and much criticized introduction), Vidoja Božinović as Ratko Mladić, and himself as Radovan Karadžić. Songs "Kada padne noć (Upomoć)", "Pogledaj dom svoj, anđele", "Ostani đubre do kraja" and "Prezir" feature the Academic Choir Obilić and Radio Television of Serbia Symphony Orchestra conducted by Vojkan Borisavljević (on "Kada padne noć (Upomoć)", "Pogledaj dom svoj, anđele" and "Ostani đubre do kraja") and by the band's keyboardist Nikola Zorić (on "Prezir").

The album cover features Bora Đorđević.

Track listing

Disc 1
"Ostaću slobodan" – 4:05
"Zvezda potkrovlja i suterena" – 2:47
"Nojeva barka" – 7:40
"Srbin je lud" – 3:53
"Jedini način" – 3:21
"Sve i svja" – 5:21
"Neću da ispadnem životinja" – 4:27
"Jedino moje" – 5:13
"Poslednja pesma o tebi" – 4:14
"Bilo je žena" – 5:27
"Sponzori" – 3:40
"Gastarbajterska pesma" – 4:20
"Zelena trava doma mog" – 4:21
"Vetar duva, duva, duva" – 5:23
"Dva dinara, druže" – 3:29
"Nemoj srećo, nemoj danas" – 4:41

Disc 2
"Južna Afrika '85 (Ja ću da pevam)" – 4:20
"Gde si u ovom glupom hotelu" – 5:12
"Odlazak u grad" – 2:48
"Avionu slomiću ti krila" – 4:41
"Amsterdam" - 6:43
"Kad sam bio mlad" – 3:36
"Ljubav ovde više ne stanuje" – 4:50
"Dobro jutro" – 6:12
"Kada padne noć (Upomoć)" – 8:07
"Pogledaj dom svoj, anđele" – 6:59
"Ostani đubre do kraja" - 4:57
"Lutka sa naslovne strane" – 4:07
"Prezir" – 5:53

Personnel
Bora Đorđević - vocals
Vidoja Božinović - guitar
Nikola Zorić - keyboard. conductor
Miša Aleksić - bass guitar
Miroslav Milatović - drums

Additional personnel
Vojkan Borisavljević - conductor
Academic Choir Obilić
Radio Television of Serbia Symphony Orchestra
Oliver Jovanović - engineer
Sreten Milojević - recorded by

References

External links
Gladijatori u BG Areni at Discogs

Riblja Čorba live albums
2008 live albums